The 2013–14 season was Leicester City F.C.'s 109th season in the English football league system and their 62nd (overall) season in the second tier of English football. They were playing their fifth consecutive season in the Football League Championship.

The season saw Leicester win their seventh second tier title, equalling the record for the most second tier titles set by Manchester City after leading the table since Boxing Day and comfortably earning promotion with six games to spare, before winning the title with two games to spare.

Along the way, they broke several club records including most points in a single season (102), most league wins in a single season (31), most league home wins in a single season (17), the most consecutive league wins (9), the most consecutive away league wins (5), the longest unbeaten run away from home in the league (13) and the most consecutive league games scored in (31) (the latter two records continued on to the following season).

Pre-season events

Note: This section does not include close season transfers or pre-season match results, which are listed in their own sections below.
1 June 2013 – Joseph Dodoo signed a professional contract until 2015.
13 June 2013 – Conrad Logan signed a 2-year contract extension until 2015.

Kit and sponsorship

The Leicester City home kit for the 2013–14 season was unveiled on 6 July 2013. It is the second kit made under the PUMA brand. The kit features a blue shirt, white shorts and blue socks with a metallic gold trim.

Friendlies

Events
Note:This section does not include transfers or match results, which are listed in their own sections below.

2 September 2013 – Wes Morgan is called up to play for Jamaica for the first time.
16 January 2014 – Wes Morgan signs a one-year contract extension until the summer of 2015.
25 January 2014 – Paul Konchesky signs a one-year contract extension until the summer of 2015.
8 May 2014 – Gary Taylor-Fletcher signs a one-year contract extension until the summer of 2015.
22 May 2014 – Marcin Wasilewski signs a one-year contract extension until the summer of 2015.
30 May 2014 – Tom Hopper signs a two-year contract extension until the summer of 2016.
31 May 2014 – Riyad Mahrez plays for Algeria for the first time.
2 June 2014 – Jacob Blyth signs a two-year contract extension until the summer of 2016.
2 June 2014 – James Pearson signs a one-year contract extension until the summer of 2015.
4 June 2014 – Kasper Schmeichel signs a four-year contract extension until the summer of 2018.
15 June 2014 – Danny Drinkwater signs a four-year contract extension until the summer of 2018.
19 June 2014 – Jak McCourt signs a one-year contract extension until the summer of 2015.
25 June 2014 – Nigel Pearson signs a three-year contract extension until the summer of 2017.
27 June 2014 – Michael Barrington signs a one-year contract extension until the summer of 2015.
27 June 2014 – Adam Smith signs a two-year contract extension until the summer of 2016.
27 June 2014 – Ryan Watson signs a two-year contract extension until the summer of 2016.

Players and staff

2013–14 squad

This section lists players who were in Leicester's first team squad at any point during the 2013–14 season
Asterisks indicates player left mid-season
Hash symbol indicates player retired mid-season
Italics indicate loan player

2013–14 backroom staff

This section lists members of staff who were in Leicester's first team squad at any point during the 2013–14 season
Asterisks indicate member of staff left mid-season

Transfers

In

Out

Loans in

Loans out

Released

Results

Football League Championship

FA Cup

Football League Cup

Awards

Club awards
At the end of the season, Leicester's annual award ceremony, including categories voted for by the players and backroom staff, the supporters and the supporters club, saw the following players recognised for their achievements for the club throughout the 2013–14 season.

Divisional awards

Championship statistics

League table

Club standings

Results by round

Scores by club
Leicester City score given first.

Club statistics
All data from LCFC.com and FoxesTalk Stats

Appearances

Starts + Substitute appearances.
Italics indicates loan player.
Asterisks indicates player left mid-season.
Hash symbol indicates player retired mid-season.

|}

Top scorers
Last Updated: 3 May 2014

Disciplinary record

Captains
Last Updated: 3 May 2014

Only counts starts as captain

Suspensions

Penalties

Overall seasonal record
Note: Games which are level after extra-time and are decided by a penalty shoot-out are listed as draws.

References

Leicester City F.C. seasons
Leicester City